Acianthus borealis, commonly known as northern mosquito orchid, is a species of flowering plant in the orchid family Orchidaceae and is endemic to Queensland in Australia. It is a glabrous, terrestrial herb with a single, heart-shaped leaf and between two and twenty transparent pinkish flowers with reddish markings and is widely distributed on the eastern tablelands.

Description
Acianthus borealis is a terrestrial, perennial, deciduous, sympodial herb with a single heart-shaped, glabrous, dark green leaf which is reddish-purple on its lower surface and often has a wavy margin. It forms spreading colonies and each plant has two fleshy tubers.

The callus is green, covers most of the labellum and has many pimply papillae near its end.

This species is distinguished from the similar Acianthus fornicatus by smaller flowers, narrower dorsal sepal, narrower petals and much more northerly distribution.

Taxonomy and naming
Acianthus borealis  was first formally described by David Jones in 1991 and the description was published in Australian Orchid Research from specimens found near Herberton on the Atherton Tableland. The specific epithet (borealis) is from the Latin borealis (northern). This species has the most northerly distribution in the Acianthus fornicatus alliance in Australia. In a 1995 paper published in the journal Allertonia, Paul Kores claimed that A. borealis and 3 other species are not distinct from A. fornicatus and should be regarded as a synonyms. That position has been adopted by Plants of the World Online.

Distribution and habitat
It is found on tablelands from the Windsor Tableland in the north-east to the Blackdown Tableland in the central east.

Ecology
The leaf of this orchid appears near the end of the wet season. The small purplish flowers last from four days to a week, resemble mosquitoes and are insect-pollinated. The aerial parts of the plants die down as warm weather returns.

Conservation
This orchid is widespread and locally common with its populations often occurring in national parks.

References

External links 
 

borealis
Orchids of Queensland
Endemic orchids of Australia
Plants described in 1991
Taxa named by David L. Jones (botanist)